Invaders from Mars is a Big Finish Productions audio drama based on the long-running British science fiction television series Doctor Who. This audio drama was later broadcast on BBC 7 in four weekly parts (starting on 29 October 2005) and was later rebroadcast on the same channel once more (beginning on 19 November 2006).

Summary
In Manhattan 1938, the Eighth Doctor and Charley meet a crooked gangster, a Russian spy, a sinister fifth columnist and Orson Welles. Welles's broadcast of War of the Worlds is just a story, but maybe there really are aliens at loose.

Cast
The Doctor — Paul McGann
Charley Pollard — India Fisher
Mouse/Winkler/Luigi/Heavy — Ian Hallard
Ellis — Mark Benton
John Houseman/Thug/Streath — Jonathan Rigby
Orson Welles/Professor Stepashin/Halliday — David Benson
Bix Biro/Noriam/Man — Paul Putner
Don Chaney/Actor — Simon Pegg
Glory Bee/Carla/Women — Jessica Stevenson
Cosmo Devine/Hotel Clerk — John Arthur
Reception Guest - Katy Manning
Radio Announcer - Mark Gatiss 
Thug/Toastmaster - Alistair Lock

Deliberate errors

The second season of Eighth Doctor audios featured a number of deliberate errors:

There were 48 States in the United States in 1938, not 49 as Chaney claims.
The CIA was not established until 1947, almost nine years after the events portrayed here.
Welles fails to recognise a Shakespearean quotation.
Don Chaney claims to own a 1929 Lamborghini previously owned by Al Capone, but Lamborghinis did not exist until 1963.

The first two "mistakes" in this list were deliberate, intended to be examples of anti-time contamination. The third was also deliberate, but was explained in The Time of the Daleks. The last was not deliberate but was later retconned to be another example of anti-time contamination.

Another possible example of anti-time contamination is the date. The War of the Worlds aired on 30 October 1938, yet, when he asks what day it is, the Doctor is told that it is 31 October 1938.

Later Doctor Who appearances
The episode is particularly notable in that 5 of the actors went on to star in the re-booted Doctor Who TV series from 2005, including: 
Mark Benton in Rose
Ian Hallard in Robot of Sherwood
Simon Pegg in The Long Game
Jessica Stevenson in The Family of Blood (as Jessica Hynes)
Mark Gatiss in a number of roles, including The Lazarus Experiment.
This does not include Paul McGann and Katy Manning who had appeared in Doctor Who prior to their appearance in this episode.

External links
Big Finish Productions - Invaders from Mars

2002 audio plays
Eighth Doctor audio plays
Radio plays based on Doctor Who
Works based on The War of the Worlds
2005 radio dramas
Works by Mark Gatiss
Fiction set in 1938